John McKellar (June 10, 1833 – February 3, 1900) was a businessman and political figure in Ontario, Canada. He was the first mayor of Fort William, Ontario (later part of Thunder Bay), serving from 1892 to 1898.

He was born in Mosa Township, London District, Upper Canada, the son of Duncan McKellar and Margaret Brodie, both immigrants from Scotland, and was schooled at home. The family moved to Ontonagon County in 1855 but left Michigan at the start of the American Civil War. McKellar and his brothers Peter and Donald laid claim to a number of mining properties north of Lake Superior; the profitable mines were generally sold to American interests. With the aid of his cousin Archibald McKellar, he received a land grant on the Kaministiquia River within the future borders of Fort William. McKellar served on the council for the municipality of Shuniah which governed the Lakehead townships. In 1881, six townships, including Neebing Additional Township where McKellar's property was located, separated from Shuniah and formed a new municipality, known as the Municipality of Neebing. McKellar later became a councillor, then reeve for Neebing 1888-92. He campaigned for the incorporation of the town of Fort William and served as its first mayor. McKellar died in Fort William at the age of 66.

The John McKellar Memorial Hospital (later McKellar General Hospital) was named in his honour in 1902.

References 

 F. Brent Scollie, Thunder Bay Mayors & Councillors 1873-1945 (Thunder Bay Historical Museum Society, 2000), 206-207.

1833 births
1900 deaths
Mayors of Fort William, Ontario